Goodenia lanata, commonly known as trailing goodenia in Victoria  and native primrose in Tasmania is a species of flowering plant in the family Goodeniaceae and is endemic to south-eastern Australia. It is a prostrate or low-lying perennial herb with hairy, egg-shaped leaves and racemes of yellow flowers.

Description

Taxonomy
The species was first formally described in 1810 by botanist Robert Brown in Prodromus Florae Novae Hollandiae. The specific epithet (lanata) means "covered with tangled hairs".

Doistribution and habitat
Trailing goodenia grows in heath, grassy woodland and open forest. It occurs mainly in southern Victoria and is widespread in Tasmania.

References

lanata
Flora of Tasmania
Flora of Victoria (Australia)
Asterales of Australia
Plants described in 1810
Taxa named by Robert Brown (botanist, born 1773)